The Capture of Rosario was an action during the Mexican Revolution, where two rebel commanders, Martin Epsinosa and the American soldier of fortune, Emil Lewis Holmdahl captured the government stronghold of Rosario.

Capture

Martín Espinosa had taken advantage of the ongoing Mexican Revolution to create a separate faction semi-loyal to the cause Francisco Madero. On May 8, Espinosa fought a battle with pro Diaz forces at La Bayona, on the south side of the Cañas River, and the following day captured Tecuala on May 9, and soon began making preparations to capture Rosario, although he lacked the dynamite to do so.

Holmdahl meanwhile was also preparing to capture Rosario but lacked the necessary manpower. Holmdahl and Espinosa decided to join forces as each had what the other wanted, and thus two launched a jointly planned attack upon Rosario. The fighting itself didn't last long and the town fell "quickly". The fall of Rosario was a serious blow for the pro-government forces and allowed the rebels to put pressure on Tepic.

Aftermath

Holmdahl and Espinosa continued their partnership and moved immediately to capture Rosamorada

References

Sources
Soldier of Fortune: Adventuring in Latin America and Mexico with Emil Lewis Holmdahl By Douglas V. Meed
Nayarit and The Mexican Revolution, 1910-1920 By. Wayne A. Sabesk
Mountjoy, Joseph B. (2013). "Aztatlan Complex". In Evans, Susan T.; Webster, David L. (eds.). Archaeology of Ancient Mexico and Central America: An Encyclopedia. Routledge
Taylor, Laurence D (1999) "The Magonista Revolt in Baja California". The Journal of San Diego History.

February 1911 events
1911 in Mexico
Mexican Revolution
Battles of the Mexican Revolution